Dehban (also Romanized as Dehbān) is a village in chahvarz District, in the Central District of Lamerd County, Fars Province, Iran. At the 2006 census, its population was 387, in 90 families.

References 

Populated places in Lamerd County